Bahreh may refer to:
 Bahreh, Bagh-e Malek, Khuzestan Province (بهره)
 Bahreh-ye Ruzeh, Khuzestan Province
 Bahreh, Razavi Khorasan (بهره)